Violet T. Lewis (May 27, 1897March 23, 1968) was an American businesswoman and educator who founded the Lewis College of Business in 1928, the only historically black college in Michigan.

Biography 

Lewis was born Violet Temple Harrison on May 27, 1897, to William and Eva Harrison, in Lima, Ohio, the second of six children. She graduated from Lima High School in 1915. Lewis attended Wilberforce University from 1915 to 1917. Lewis' first job was secretary to the president of Selma University, in Alabama. She also taught secretarial classes in its business department. She later moved to Indianapolis, Indiana, where she worked as a bookkeeper. Lewis took a $50 loan and opened the Lewis Business College in 1928 in Indianapolis, after noticing a large number of young unemployed people. She married Thomas Garfield Lewis in 1920, and had two children before their divorce in 1943. Lewis started her own radio program, "The Negro Melody Hour", with a hope of boosting enrollment to the college. The program made her the first black radio announcer in Indiana.

Lewis owned multiple other small businesses in Indianapolis, including an ice cream shop and a store selling Christmas trees and fireworks. She organized an additional school in Detroit, Michigan in 1939, which opened the following February. Lewis eventually closed the Indiana college once the college's success in Detroit became apparent. She later founded the Gamma Phi Delta sorority.

Lewis died on March 23, 1968, at the age of 70.

Honors and awards 
Lewis received a posthumous honorary doctorate from Wilberforce University. In 1992, she was inducted into the Michigan Women's Hall of Fame. In 2021, a portion of the M-10 highway in Detroit was named the Violet T. Lewis Memorial Highway.

References 

20th-century American businesswomen
20th-century American businesspeople
20th-century African-American businesspeople
Wilberforce University alumni
1897 births
1968 deaths